James Haskins (September 19, 1941 – July 6, 2005) was an American author with more than 100 books for both adults and children. Many of his books highlight the achievements of African Americans and cover the history and culture of Africa and the African American experience. His work also included many biographical subjects, ranging from Lena Horne and Hank Aaron to Scatman Crothers and Malcolm X. Most of his writings were for young people. He wrote on a great variety of subjects that introduced young people to the language and cultures of other continents, especially Africa.

Biography
Haskins was born in Demopolis, Alabama and spent his childhood in a household with many children. He received his high school education in Boston, Massachusetts. He received a B.A. degree from Georgetown University in 1960, a B.S. degree from Alabama State University in 1962, and a M.A. degree from the University of New Mexico in 1963.

After graduation, before he decided to become a teacher, Haskins moved to New York City and worked as a stock trader on Wall Street. He taught music and special education classes in Harlem. His first book, Diary of a Harlem Schoolteacher, was a result of his experience. He was a professor of English at the University of Florida and lived in New York City.

Haskins died in 2005 of complications from emphysema.

Writing
Haskins' picture books, with many brightly colored pictures and few words, were geared to young children just learning to read. They tend to highlight the achievements of African Americans in society. The characters in his stories cover the gamut of African American role models, from Rosa Parks to the black members of the Hannibal Guards, a military organization in Pittsburgh during the Civil War.

Haskins' 1977 picture book The Cotton Club, featuring gangsters, jilted love, and pre-prohibition gangsters, was used as inspiration for the 1984 film of the same name.

In 1998, his young adult book African American Entrepreneurs was published by Jossey-Bass in English. The book followed the success of his first work, Voodoo and Hoodoo: The Craft as Revealed by Traditional Practitioners, published some 20 years prior.

Awards
Haskins won many awards for his work. Several of his books won the Coretta Scott King Award, including The Story of Stevie Wonder, which won the award in 1976; and Lena Horne, which won the same award in 1984. Bricktop was chosen by the English-Speaking Union to be a Book-Across-the-Sea in 1983. Black Music in America won the 1988 Carter G. Woodson Book Award of the National Council for the Social Studies. His four-book Count Your Way series (Arab World, China, Japan, and Russia) won the Alabama Library Association Award for best work for children in 1988. In 1994, he was presented the Washington Post Children's Book Guide Award.

Selected bibliography
 Diary of a Harlem Schoolteacher (Grove Press, 1969)
 Profiles in Black Power (1972)
 The Story of Stevie Wonder (1975)
 Pele: A Biography (1976)
 Scott Joplin: The Man Who Made Ragtime (1978)
 Voodoo and Hoodoo: The Craft as Revealed by Traditional Practitioners (1978)
 James Van DerZee: The Picture Takin' Man (1980)
 Bricktop (1983)
 Lena Horne (1983)
 Black Music in America: A History Through Its People (1987)
 Count Your Way series (1987)
 Mr. Bojangles: The Biography of Bill Robinson (Morrow, 1988)
 I Have a Dream: The Life and Works of Martin Luther King, Jr. (1992)
 One More River to Cross: The Stories of Twelve Black Americans (Scholastic Corporation, 1992)
 The March on Washington (1994)
 African American Entrepreneurs (Jossey-Bass, 1998)
 Black Stars: African American Military Heroes (1998)
 Great Ghost Stories (Morrow, 1998) (Compiled by Peter Glassman, Illustrated by Barry Moser)
 Rosa Parks: My Story (with Rosa Parks) (1999)
Conjure Times: Black Magicians in America (with Kathleen Benson) (2001)

References

Bibliography
 Gale References Team, Who's Who Among African Americans: Biography — Haskins, James S. (1941). (Gale, 2005).
 Kumar, Lisa, Something About the Author. Volume 165 (Thomson Gale, 2006).
 Also see James Haskins in This Goodly Land: Alabama's Literary Landscape

External links
This Goodly Land Author Information for James S. Haskins
James S. Haskins Collection, Special and Area Studies Collections, University of Florida George A. Smathers Libraries
Diaries of a Prolific Professor : Undergraduate Research from the James Haskins Manuscript Collection
 

1941 births
2005 deaths
African-American writers
Alabama State University alumni
American children's writers
American writers of young adult literature
Carter G. Woodson Book Award winners
Deaths from emphysema
Georgetown University alumni
People from Demopolis, Alabama
University of New Mexico alumni
20th-century African-American people
21st-century African-American people